Crookhaven is a village in County Cork, Ireland, on the most southwestern tip of the island of Ireland. With an out-of-season population of about sixty, it swells in the summer season to about four hundred, when the occupants of the seasonal holiday homes arrive.

History
The village name is attributed to an association with the Crooke family, and initially with Sir Thomas Crooke, 1st Baronet who also founded Baltimore, County Cork about 1610. The Crooke family were granted large estates in West Cork in the early 17th century, but their association with the area ended around 1665, on the death of Sir Thomas's son and heir Sir Samuel. In the late 1500s and early 1600s the village was used as a base for piracy - where not only the local justices (including the vice-admiral of Munster) but the broader population were involved. These activities were unaffected by official discouragement under King James VI and I, but the Dutch attack on Crookhaven in 1614 did significant damage and English piracy in the region declined thereafter.

The village was an important port of call for shipping between Europe and the United States, and many inhabitants were in the business of supplying the ships as they sheltered in Crookhaven after or before a long voyage. In 1959 Crookhaven was the subject of a film by English film maker James Clarke in his film Irish Village. At that time the film records the population of the town and local farms as being 69.

Crookhaven was also used by Guglielmo Marconi as a location for experiments in wireless communication and ship-to-shore communication. Some of these tests and experiments took place between the Fastnet lighthouse, Crookhaven, and Cape Clear Island - since they were so closely connected. The area was useful for these purposes as a fixed telegraph line also connected Crookhaven and Cape Clear Island - located eight miles away. Marconi worked here from 1901 until 1914 when he sold the rights. The station was ultimately destroyed in 1922.

Amenities
The village has three pubs. O'Sullivans faces the harbour and its walls are adorned with historical pictures of the village and notes about the area.

Nottage's (or The Welcome Inn) is only open during the summer. The pub was once owned by a Mr Nottage, who came to the village from England to work at the Marconi signal station.

The third pub is The Crookhaven Inn. The pub building today was once the bottle store for the larger pub and hotel located across the road. When the original building was converted to flats, the bottle store was converted.

The village also has a shop and post office located next to O'Sullivans.

As with certain other amenities, the Crookhaven Harbour Sailing Club also only opens in the summer.

Places of interest
The road to the village comes from Goleen and curves around the harbour. As one drives from Goleen, one passes a road to the left leading onto Rock Island. Originally this was the site of a coast guard station - which replaced an earlier station to its south. The "new" station was occupied from 1907 until 1921. During the height of the War of Independence, British Marines were stationed there to protect the station and Brow Head War Signal Station. During their occupation, the IRA destroyed Brow Head. Also on Rock Island was a fishery plant. From here most of the shellfish of Ireland was exported to Europe. The ponds were open until the late 1970s, then it became a food processing plant packaging garlic butter and mussels - but since fell derelict.

Transport & communications
The nearest airport to Crookhaven is Cork Airport, and the regional road R591 ends in the village. Crookhaven has no scheduled public transport.

Notable people
Jeremiah Coghlan, naval captain in the French Revolutionary and Napoleonic Wars, "an officer almost unrivaled in heroic exploits".

See also

 Lighthouses in Ireland
 List of towns and villages in Ireland

References

Towns and villages in County Cork
Tourist attractions in County Cork
Pirate dens and locations